Hans Ruep (born 18 June 1960) is a retired Austrian para table tennis player who competed at international level events. He is a double World medalist, ten-time European medalist and has competed at the Paralympic Games four times where he reached the bronze medal match in the men's team event at the 2008 Summer Paralympics with Andreas Vevera when they lost to South Korea.

References

1960 births
Living people
People from Wels
Paralympic table tennis players of Austria
Table tennis players at the 2000 Summer Paralympics
Table tennis players at the 2004 Summer Paralympics
Table tennis players at the 2008 Summer Paralympics
Table tennis players at the 2012 Summer Paralympics
Sportspeople from Upper Austria
Austrian male table tennis players